Falsocossyphini is a tribe of darkling beetles in the family Tenebrionidae. There are at least three genera in Falsocossyphini.

Genera
These genera belong to the tribe Falsocossyphini:
 Blatticephalus Heller, 1918  (tropical Africa)
 Falsocossyphus Pic, 1916  (Indomalaya)
 Microblattellus Ferrer, 2006  (Indomalaya)

References

Further reading

 
 

Tenebrionoidea